The 2020–21 Boston College Eagles men's ice hockey team represented Boston College in the 2020–21 NCAA Division I men's ice hockey season. The team was coached by Jerry York, '67, his twenty-seventh season behind the bench at Boston College. The Eagles played their home games at Kelley Rink on the campus of Boston College, competing in Hockey East.

Due to the COVID-19 pandemic, no out-of-conference games were scheduled for the regular season, nor any traditional mid-season tournaments. As a result, the Eagles did not compete in any tournaments, including the annual Beanpot championship, which would have been in its 69th year of competition.

The Eagles finished the season 17–6–1, and 16–4–1 in conference play, good for 1st place in Hockey East, however, no regular season title was officially awarded due to disparate scheduling among the conference. They advanced to the semifinals of the Hockey East tournament where they lost 5–6 in double overtime to the UMass Lowell River Hawks. Boston College returned to the NCAA Tournament for the first time since 2016, as the top seed of the Northeast Regional hosted in Albany, New York. Their first round meeting with Notre Dame was ruled a no-contest as the Fighting Irish were forced to withdraw from the tournament due to COVID-19 protocols, and the Eagles advanced to the Regional final via forfeit. There, they were defeated by the St. Cloud State Huskies by a score of 1–4.

Previous season recap

The Eagles entered the 2020–21 season following a strong 2019–20 effort. With a 24–8–2 record, going 17–6–1 in conference play, the Eagles finished first in Hockey East and captured their 20th regular season title; rebounding from a 7th place finish in the previous year. However, that would be the only post-season trophy possible to earn, as both the Hockey East and NCAA tournaments were cancelled due to the COVID-19 pandemic before any games were played. The Eagles were a likely NCAA tournament qualifier which would have ended a three-year drought from the nationals. Additionally, they failed to secure any mid-season tournament title, their only tournament result being their third-place Beanpot finish.

Departures

Thirteen Eagles departed from the program from the 2019–20 roster:

Graduation:

Luke McInnis, Senior – D
Ben Finkelstein, Senior – D
Connor Moore, Senior – D
Jesper Mattila, Senior – D
Zach Walker, Senior – F
David Cotton, Senior – F
Mike Merulla, Senior – F
Julius Mattila, Senior – F
Graham McPhee, Senior – F
Ron Greco, Senior – F
Ryan Edquist, Senior – G

Signed Professionally:
Aapeli Räsänen, Junior – F (Kalevan Pallo of the Finish Elite League) 

Not Retained:

Adin Farhat, Junior – G

Mid-Season Departures:
Stephen Davies, Freshman – D (Halifax Mooseheads of the QMJHL, did not dress for any games and signed during the winter break)
Logan Hutsko, Senior – F (Florida Panthers, signed after season-ending injury in February 2021)

Recruiting
Boston College added eleven freshmen for the 2020–21 season: six forwards, four defensemen, and a goalie. Additionally, sophomore forward Liam Izyk transferred into the program from the Alabama–Huntsville Chargers.

Additionally, some mid-season roster additions occurred during the winter break:
Junior defenseman Jack St. Ivany transferred from Yale and was immediately eligible to play.
Senior goaltender Adin Farhat was officially recalled from the club team, as he not retained on the roster at the beginning of the season.

2020–2021 roster

2020–21 Eagles

As of January 9, 2021.

Coaching staff

Standings

Schedule

|-
!colspan=12 ! style=""; | Regular season

|-
!colspan=12 ! style=""; | 

|-
!colspan=12 ! style=""; | 

† Notre Dame was forced to withdraw from the regional semifinal match on March 27, as the team received multiple positive COVID tests on March 25. The game was ruled a no-contest and the Eagles automatically advanced to the regional final.

Rankings

Statistics

Skaters

Goaltenders

Awards and honors

Hobey Baker Award
Spencer Knight, G – Top 10 Finalist
Matt Boldy, F – Top 10 Finalist

Mike Richter Award
Spencer Knight, G – Top 3 Finalist

CCM/AHCA All-Americans
Spencer Knight, G – First Team East
Matt Boldy, F – First Team East
Drew Helleson, D – Second Team East

Hockey East Awards
Spencer Knight, G – Goaltender of the Year, Player of the Year
Marc McLaughlin, F – Best Defensive Forward, Three Stars Award (Shared with Jonny Evans, Connecticut and Aidan McDonough, Northeastern)
Drew Helleson, D – Best Defensive Defenseman
Nikita Nesterenko, F – Co-Rookie of the Year (Shared with Josh Lopina, Massachusetts)
Jerry York, Coach – Coach of the Year

Hockey East All-Stars
Spencer Knight, G – First Team
Matt Boldy, F – First Team
Drew Helleson, D – First Team
Marc McLaughlin, F – Third Team
Eamon Powell, D – All-Rookie Team
Nikita Nesterenko, F – All-Rookie Team

Hockey East Goaltender of the Month
Spencer Knight, G – Month of December

Hockey East Player of the Week
Matt Boldy, F Week of November 30, 2020Week of December 7, 2020Week of February 15, 2021 (Shared with Aidan McDonough, Northeastern)Week of March 8, 2021 (Shared with Jáchym Kondelík, Connecticut)
Spencer Knight, G – Week of December 7, 2020
Marc McLaughlin, F – Week of February 22, 2021

Hockey East Defensive Player of the Week
Drew Helleson, D – Week of November 30, 2020

Hockey East Rookie of the Week
Colby Ambrosio, F – Week of November 30, 2020
Nikita Nesterenko, F – Week of January 18, 2021, Week of March 15, 2021
Henry Wilder, G – Week of December 14, 2020

Players drafted into the NHL

2021 NHL Entry Draft

† incoming freshman

References

External links
BC Men's Hockey Home Page
BC Men's Hockey Page on USCHO

Boston College Eagles men's ice hockey seasons
Boston College Eagles
Boston College Eagles
Boston College Eagles men's ice hockey
Boston College Eagles men's ice hockey
Boston College Eagles men's ice hockey
Boston College Eagles men's ice hockey